Andhra Ghech is a village in Chitral district and the Hindu Kush area of Pakistan.

References

Populated places in Chitral District
Hill stations in Pakistan
Populated places along the Silk Road